The Israel Youth State Cup (Avi Ran Youth Cup), is a knockout cup competition for under-19s in Israeli football, run by the Israel Football Association.

The cup is named after former Maccabi Haifa and Israel goalkeeper, Avi Ran.

History
A cup competition for youth players was first organized in 1943–44. The competition was won by Maccabi Tel Aviv. After the establishment of Israel the competition was renewed in 1949 for a single tournament, and two tournaments were held in 1954 and 1955. Since 1958 the competition was played annually. The competition was called Kerner Cup until 1966 and later, until 1977, Jerusalem Cup.

Format
The youth cup is a knockout, played by all the teams affiliated with the IFA. Lower tier teams enter the first stages and are joined in the fourth round by Israeli Noar Premier League teams.

List of finals

Results by team
Teams shown in italics are no longer in existence.

Notes

References
 Avi Ran Youth Cup Israel Football Association 
 

 
Football competitions in Israel
Youth football in Israel